Bernard Jones (27 September 1924 – 2000) was an English footballer who played in the Football League for Port Vale. He later turned out for non-league sides Winsford United, Macclesfield Town and Stafford Rangers.

Career
Jones played for Crewe Alexandra and Longport, before joining Gordon Hodgson's Port Vale in October 1948. He played six Third Division South and one FA Cup game in the 1948–49 season. Failing to earn a first team spot at The Old Recreation Ground, he was transferred to Winsford United in November 1949, and later played for Macclesfield Town and Stafford Rangers. He was a member of the Macclesfield Town team which won the Cheshire Senior Cup in 1951 and 1952.

Career statistics
Source:

Honours
Macclesfield Town
Cheshire Senior Cup: 1951 & 1952

References

1924 births
2000 deaths
Footballers from Stoke-on-Trent
English footballers
Association football midfielders
Crewe Alexandra F.C. players
Port Vale F.C. players
Winsford United F.C. players
Macclesfield Town F.C. players
Stafford Rangers F.C. players
English Football League players